Urman, Ukraine is a village in Ternopil Raion of Ternopil Oblast.

Urman may also refer to:

Places
 Urman, Bakalinsky District, Republic of Bashkortostan, Russia
 Urman, Iglinsky District, Republic of Bashkortostan, Russia
 Urman, Nurimanovsky District, Republic of Bashkortostan, Russia
 Urman-Asty, Dyurtyulinsky District, Republic of Bashkortostan, Russia
 Urman-Bishkadak, Ishimbaysky District, Republic of Bashkortostan, Russia
 Urman, Syria

People
 Jennie Snyder Urman (born 1975), American television producer
 Mark Urman (1952–2019), American film executive, producer and distributor